Simeulue Regency is a regency in the Aceh special region of Indonesia. It had a population of 80,674 at the 2010 census and 92,865 at the 2020 census; the official estimate as at mid 2021 was 93,762.

With its isolated geographic location and its linguistic difference from mainland Aceh, Simeulue has not been affected by the turmoil of conflicts in mainland Aceh between the Indonesian government and the Free Aceh Movement (GAM). There has been no major GAM activity on the island.

Administration 

Simeulue was once a part of West Aceh Regency but was split off in 1999 with the hope that the region's development would improve. The seat of the regency is Sinabang.

The regency was divided at 2010 into eight districts (kecamatan), but two additional districts were created in 2012. All are listed below with their areas and their populations at the 2010 census and 2020 census, together with the official estimates as at mid 2021. The table also includes the locations of the district administrative centres, the number of villages (rural desa and urban kelurahan) and the number of offshore islands (of which just two are inhabited) in each district, and its post code.

Notes: (a) of which the island of Pulau Siumat is inhabited. (b) of which the island of Pulau Teupah is inhabited. 
(c) The 2010 population of the Teupah Tengah District is included in the figure for the Simeulue Timur District, from which it was cut out in 2012.
(d) The 2010 population of the Simeulue Cut District is included in the figure for the Simeulue Tengah District, from which it was cut out in 2012.

Villages
Administrative villages (desa) listed for each district:

Demographics 
The people of Simeulue are similar to the people in the neighboring Nias Island, speaking 3 languages (Devayan, Sigulai and Leukon) which are distinctly different from the languages spoken in mainland Aceh. The vast majority (99.7% in 2020) of the people of Simeulue are Muslim.

Earthquakes 
Simeulue was close to the epicenter of the 9.3 magnitude 26 December 2004 earthquake, but loss of life was surprisingly low, mainly because the people are familiar with earthquakes and tsunamis in this seismically active region and so knew to leave the coast after the earthquake. A major earthquake and tsunami hit Simeulue in 1907, killing many of its inhabitants. Many died when they rushed to the beach after seeing the water recede, exposing the coral and fish. They went to collect the fish, not realizing that the water would come back. Those who survived told the story of the 1907 semong, the local word for tsunami, to their children. It is largely because of this oral history that many in Simeulue say that they knew what to do when the 26 December 2004 earthquake and tsunami struck. In the fishing village of Kariya Vhapi on the NW shore of Simuelue, the 26 December 2004 tsunami was approximately 2 m high when it went through the village completely destroying all buildings.

On 28 March 2005 an 8.7 magnitude stuck with its epicenter just off the south end of Simeulue Island. During the earthquake, Simeulue rose at least six feet on the western coast; this left the flat top of its coral reefs above high tide level leaving it dry and dead. On the east coast, the land was submerged, seawater flooding fields and settlements. At the village of Kariya Vhapi the 28 March 2005 tsunami was smaller than the one the previous December and did not damage the village; however it did overtop a 3.2 m high beach berm. In Sinabang the 28 March 2005 earthquake and subsequent fire destroyed 50 to 60 percent of the downtown area and significantly damaged the port facility. At Sinabang the uplift was less than further north being only 40 cm.

On 20 February 2008 at 03:08 PM local time, Simeulue suffered a 7.4 magnitude earthquake.

On 11 April 2012 at 04:38 PM local time, Simeulue suffered an 8.6 magnitude earthquake.

References 

Regencies of Aceh